Behula is a 1966 Bengali film directed by Zahir Raihan and stars Razzak and Shuchanda as lead pair. It was based on the Hindu mythology of Behula, who fights vehemently to goddess Manasa for her husband Lakhindar's life. The director was searching for a suitable hero for the character Lakhindar, he auditioned for many a man. Razzak came to give audition with a beard unshaved for seven days. This proved lucky for him as he was selected by the director. It is one of the six films where Razzak and Shuchanda shared screen time.

References

External links
 

1966 films
Bangladeshi drama films
Bengali-language Pakistani films
Films scored by Satya Saha
Films directed by Zahir Raihan
1960s Bengali-language films